The ISU Junior World Cup Speed Skating is a series of international long track speed skating matches, organised yearly by the International Skating Union. It is the second most important competition for juniors, behind the World Junior Speed Skating Championships. The format is comparable to the ISU Speed Skating World Cup, but only junior skaters (up until the season they turn 19) are allowed to enter. Starting in the 2016–17 season, a competition for "neo-seniors" was added.

The first edition was held in the 2008–09 season with competition in five distances for both men (boys) and ladies (girls). The 500, 1000, 1500 and team pursuit were run for both sexes and while the ladies had a competition over 3000 meters, the men had a competition over the combined 3000 and 5000 meters. In the 2011–12 season the mass start event (12 laps for men, 8 laps for ladies) was added and in the 2013–14 season a team sprint event (3 laps) was held for the first time. The results for the team sprint and team pursuit events are combined in the final rankings. Since the 2014–15 season the mass start is held over 10 laps for both men and ladies.

In November 2011 the ISU Junior World Cup Speed Skating was used as part of the qualification process for the speed skating at the 2012 Winter Youth Olympics.

Overall winners

Junior

Men

Women

Neo-Senior

Men

Women

See also 
 ISU Speed Skating World Cup
 World Junior Speed Skating Championships
 List of world cups and world championships for juniors and youth

References

External links
 ISU results
 Winners of ISU Junior World Cup trophies (2008/09 – 2014/15)

Junior
International speed skating competitions
World youth sports competitions
Recurring sporting events established in 2008
International Skating Union competitions